The 1975 New Zealand Open, also known as Benson and Hedges Open for sponsorship reasons, was a professional men's tennis tournament held in Auckland, New Zealand. It was an independent event, i.e. not part of the 1975 Grand Prix or 1975 World Championship Tennis circuit. It was the eighth edition of the tournament and was played on outdoor grass courts from 6 January through 12 January 1975. First-seeded Onny Parun won the singles title.

Finals

Singles

 Onny Parun defeated  Brian Fairlie 4–6, 6–4, 6–4, 6–7, 6–4
 It was Parun's only title of the year and the 5th of his career.

Doubles
 Bob Carmichael /  Ray Ruffels defeated  Brian Fairlie /  Onny Parun 7–6, RET  
 It was Carmichael's only title of the year and the 10th of his career. It was Ruffels's 1st title of the year and the 7th of his career.

Notes

References

External links
 ATP – tournament profile
 ITF – tournament edition details

Heineken Open
ATP Auckland Open
January 1975 sports events in New Zealand
New